Great Lakes Christian High School is a private Christian high school in Beamsville, Ontario affiliated with the Churches of Christ.

History
Great Lakes Christian High School began operation in 1952 on the former estate of S.T. Creet, who had purchased the property from the estate of Senator William Gibson in 1918]. Mr. Creet was a businessman in Ontario's Niagara Peninsula with connections from Lewiston, New York to Toronto. He and a friend, Mr. Williams, and built the Deer Park Golf Club in Grimsby, and he was also a member of the Toronto Board of Trade. He was taken around the Niagara Peninsula in 1918 by an immigration minister to find a home large enough for his family. He bought the property of Senator Gibson based on the size of the home and its beautiful elm trees. Creet had many renovations done to the house and brought it into the twentieth century with kitchen improvements and installing plumbing.  The school was started by members of the Church of Christ to help train future leadership for the church.

Now
In 2008 the name was changed to Great Lakes Christian High School.
The High School now has a student body of about 110 students.  The academic, residential and extracurricular programs are outstanding.  There are about 30 international students at the school and they hold 15 different passports.
Although the school was started by members of the Church of Christ — all faith backgrounds are welcomed.

High schools in the Regional Municipality of Niagara
Private schools in Ontario
Christian schools in Canada
1952 establishments in Ontario
Educational institutions established in 1952